The behavioral assumption is one of the basics theories in classical finance. The assumption is that, under their resource constraints, human attempt to maximize their utilities, which means biggest profit and outcomes.

The two most important characteristics of the human under the behavioral assumption are rationality and self-interest.

References 

Finance theories